Shaheed Raja Bhau Mahakal Bus Stand or Dewas Gate Inter State Bus Stand is a bus terminus in Ujjain, Madhya Pradesh. Dewas Gate is a bus terminus that provides bus service to destinations located in other states. Nana Kheda is the largest Bus stand in Madhya Pradesh. Dewas Gate may also provide bus services to destinations in the same state.

Bus Stand is the main bus stand at time of Simhastha. Buses are available for Jaipur, Ajmer, Indore, Bhopal, Pune, Gujarat, Maharashtra, Rajasthan and various other locations.

References 

Bus stations in Madhya Pradesh
Transport in Ujjain
Parking facilities in India
Year of establishment missing